Wimba Sutan Fanosa (born January 27, 1987) is an Indonesian professional footballer who plays as a striker for Liga 3 club Persika Karanganyar.

Honours

Persik Kediri
 Liga 2: 2019

References

External links
 Wimba Sutan at Liga Indonesia
 

1987 births
Living people
Sportspeople from Malang
Indonesian footballers
Association football forwards
Persik Kediri players